Rodney Mullinar (born 1942) is a British Australian actor, noted for his roles on Australian television. He emigrated to Australia with his first wife, casting agent Liz Mullinar in 1969.

Career
Mullinar took the leading role in Australian espionage drama Hunter late in the show's run in 1968, however he appeared in just eight episodes due to the cancellation of the series. He subsequently played the title role in television series Ryan (1973). His first wife was casting agent Liz Mullinar and his second wife was actress Penny Ramsey, daughter of actress Lois Ramsey.
 
Mullinar's other credits include: Cop Shop, Bellbird, Homicide, Division 4, Matlock Police, Against the Wind, Breaker Morant, Prisoner, Five Mile Creek, All Saints, Stingers, Joanne Lees: Murder in the Outback, Reef Doctors, The Lost World,  and The Doctor Blake Mysteries.

Filmography

External links

Category:People from Hereford

1942 births
Australian male film actors
Australian male soap opera actors
British male film actors
British male soap opera actors
Living people
20th-century Australian male actors
20th-century British male actors
21st-century Australian male actors
21st-century British male actors
English emigrants to Australia